Alexandra Doig  (born June 8, 1973) is a Canadian actress. She played the title role in the science fiction television series Andromeda (2000–2005).  She also played the lead female role of Rowan in the science fiction-action horror film Jason X (2001), the tenth installment of the Friday the 13th film series. Since 2015, Doig has appeared in the Aurora Teagarden mystery television film series on the Hallmark Movies & Mysteries channel.

Early life
Doig was born in Ontario, Canada, on June 8, 1973, and grew up in Toronto.  She is the younger child of Gloria B. Lecciones and David W. Doig. Her mother is a registered nurse who originally came from Dumaguete, Philippines, and her father is a Canadian engineer of Scottish ancestry who was a petroleum executive officer in Toronto.

As a child, Doig studied rhythmic gymnastics, and as a teenager studied American Sign Language. She developed a strong interest in acting and was inspired to become an actor at age nine after she watched a theatre production of Porgy and Bess.

Career

Early modeling
While completing compulsory secondary education at Don Mills Collegiate Institute, she enrolled in a vocational modelling program. There, at age 16, she was immediately offered representation by a talent agent and booked in various modelling projects. She chose to drop out from her final year in high school to pursue an acting career.

The initial media exposure led to her co-hosting the Canadian game show Video & Arcade Top 10 (1991–2006). While auditioning for television and film roles, she worked on theatre productions of Romeo and Juliet and Arsenic and Old Lace.

Acting
Her first television acting role was as "Second Girl" on The Hidden Room in 1993. Her first recurring role was in the TV series TekWar in 1994 where she portrayed the role of Cowgirl. Her first movie role was in Jungleground (1995). Doig got her first big break with a starring role in the movie No Alibi in 2000.  She also landed the title role in Gene Roddenberry's sci-fi TV series Andromeda where, from 2000 to 2005, she portrayed the Andromeda Ascendant ship's computer in three personas — as the ship's powerful AI (artificial intelligence) on the ship's screen, as the AI's hologram, and as Rommie, the android avatar of the AI.

In 2001, she played the female lead role of  "Dr. Rowan LaFontaine" in the horror film Jason X, the tenth installment of the Friday the 13th film series. In a recurring role as Dr. Carolyn Lam, Doig  appeared in 11 episodes of the ninth and tenth seasons of Stargate SG-1 between 2005–2007. In 2010, Doig appeared in six episodes in the remake of V as the alien physician Dr. Leah Pearlman. In 2012, she began playing the role of Liber8 terrorist Sonya Valentine in the Canadian science fiction TV series Continuum.

In 2017, Doig began playing the recurring role of Talia al Ghul in the fifth season of Arrow. The same year she began portraying DeAnn Anderson, one of the main roles in the E! television series The Arrangement.

In 2019, Doig joined the cast of the Netflix television series Virgin River, based on the Virgin River series of novels by Robyn Carr, playing Paige Lassiter.

Personal life
Doig dated actor Michael Shanks after they met on the set of Andromeda, where the former starred and the latter guest-starred in the 2001 episode "Star Crossed."  They married on August 2, 2003, and they worked together again in the 2003 episode "Day of Judgment, Day of Wrath" of the same TV series. The couple were castmates in the final two seasons of Stargate SG-1. They worked together in the action thriller Tactical Force (2011), in which Doig portrayed an LAPD SWAT officer and Shanks played the role of a Russian mob leader. They worked together on the Netflix Original series Virgin River (2019). They have two children, a son and a daughter, in addition to Shanks' child from a previous relationship.

Charity
Doig and Shanks are actively involved as charity fundraising partners for the Multiple Sclerosis Society of Canada.

Filmography

Film

Television

References

External links
 
 

1973 births
Actresses from Toronto
Canadian actresses of Filipino descent
Canadian film actresses
Canadian people of Irish descent
Canadian people of Scottish descent
Canadian television actresses
Living people
20th-century Canadian actresses
21st-century Canadian actresses
Canadian voice actresses